Sir Henry Conway, 1st Baronet (1630–1669) was a Welsh landowner and politician who sat in the House of Commons of England from 1661 to 1669.

Conway was the son of William Conway of Bodrythan, Flintshire and his wife Lucy Mostyn, daughter of Thomas Mostyn of Rhyd. He was Sheriff of Flintshire from 1656 to 1657. He was created a baronet on 25 July 1660. In 1661, he was elected Member of Parliament for Flintshire in the Cavalier Parliament.
 
Conway died at the age of about 39.

Conway married Mary Lloyd, daughter of Richard Lloyd of Esclusham, Denbighshire. He was succeeded by his son John.

References

1630 births
1669 deaths
Members of the Parliament of England (pre-1707) for constituencies in Wales
17th-century Welsh politicians
Welsh landowners
Baronets in the Baronetage of England
High Sheriffs of Flintshire
English MPs 1661–1679